Scrobipalpula tussilaginis is a moth in the family Gelechiidae. The original publication for the name (as Gelechia tussilaginis) appears to be by Stainton in 1867, but it is sometimes attributed to Frey. It is found in Great Britain, Sweden, the Netherlands, France, Germany, Denmark, Austria, Switzerland, Italy, Poland, the Czech Republic, Slovakia, Slovenia, Hungary, Romania, the North Macedonia, Greece, Ukraine and Russia.

The wingspan is 12–14 mm. Adults are on wing from June to July and again from August to September in two generations per year.

The larvae feed on Petasites albus, Petasites hybridus and Tussilago farfara. They mine the leaves of their host plant. The mine starts as a branching corridor, but later becomes an elongate upper-surface blotch which finally occupies a large portion of the leaf. Most frass is deposited in one section of the mine, forming a crust below which the larva can retreat. Pupation takes place outside of the mine, at the underside of the leaf or in litter. The larvae are apple green with a dark brown head.

References

 Huemer, P.; Karsholt, O. 1998: A review of the Old World Scrobipalpula (Gelechiidae), with special reference to central and northern Europe. Nota lepidopterologica (ISSN 0342-7536), 21(1): 37-65. BHL

Scrobipalpula
Moths described in 1867